Richard Langridge,  D.D. was  an English Anglican priest in the 16th century.

Lever was  educated at Merton College, Oxford. He held livings in Colchester, Barkway and Wheldrake. Langridge was Archdeacon of Cleveland from 1534 until his death in 1547.

Notes

1547 deaths
16th-century English Anglican priests
Archdeacons of Cleveland
Alumni of Merton College, Oxford